East Leeds are an amateur rugby league football club from Leeds, West Yorkshire. The club currently competes in the top division of the National Conference League. The club also operates a number of academy teams.

Founded by Glen Davies and Rod Keeligan, East Leeds ARLC began life in 1979 as an under-11’s team. Run from the Black Dog Pub they were called the Black Dog Pups. When the teams expanded the next season it moved to East Leeds Working Men’s club. The club closed in 2008, leaving East Leeds ARLFC playing out of Harehills Liberal Club. In 2010 the team got funding and took ownership of the building previously owned by East Leeds Working men’s club. The building is owned by a registered charity called East Leeds Community Sports Club Registered Charity Number 1137140.

Notable players
Leroy Rivett,
Richie Mathers,
Danny McGuire,
Chris Clarkson, Mikolaj Oledzki, Lois Forsell, Rob Roberts

External links
Official website
East Leeds ARLFC on NCL website

Rugby league teams in West Yorkshire
BARLA teams
Rugby clubs established in 1979
1979 establishments in England
English rugby league teams